Mario Teqja (born 20 May 1996) is an Albanian professional footballer who plays as a defender for Albanian club Erzeni Shijak and the Albania national under-21 football team.

Club career

Early career
Teqja start his youth career with Shkëndija Tiranë at age of 15 and in 2015 he moved to Erzeni Shijak. Regarded as one of the most promising players in his role in Albania, Teqja is currently sought after by many European clubs such as: Inter Milan, Ludogorets and the Young Boys of Switzerland.

Mario Teqja leads his new club KS Egnatia Rrogozhinë to promotion on Superliga during the season 2020–2021. Together with his former teammate Orian Xhemalaj at Erzeni Shijak they showed up high physical condition and determination in defense.

International career
Teqja received his first international call up at the Albania national under-21 football team by coach Alban Bushi for a gathering between 14 and 17 May 2017 with most of the players selected from Albanian championships.

Career statistics

Club

References

External links

Mario Teqja profile FSHF.org

1996 births
Living people
Footballers from Durrës
Albanian footballers
Association football defenders
Albania youth international footballers
Albania under-21 international footballers
KF Erzeni players
Kategoria e Parë players